This is a list of the 48 stations of the Budapest Metro, which operates in Budapest, Hungary, including the dates of opening (and closure). Termini and interchange stations are in bold and bold italics, respectively. Stations with the access icon are barrier-free.

Lines

Stations

M1 Line (Millennium Underground)

M2 Line (East-West line)

M3 Line (North-South line)
First section in 1976, then expansions in 1980, 1981, 1984 and 1990. It is usually marked blue. According to schedule, it runs along in 31 minutes.

 Kőbánya-Kispest 1980 
 Határ út 1980
 Pöttyös utca 1980
 Ecseri út 1980
 Népliget 1980
 Nagyvárad tér 1976
 Semmelweis Klinikák (formerly: Klinikák) 1976
 Corvin-negyed (formerly: Ferenc körút) 1976
 Kálvin tér 1976
 Ferenciek tere (formerly: Felszabadulás tér) 1976
 Deák Ferenc tér 1976
 Arany János utca 1981
 Nyugati pályaudvar (formerly: Marx tér) 1981
 Lehel tér (formerly: Élmunkás tér) 1981
 Dózsa György út 1984; 2019 (renovation)
 Göncz Árpád városközpont (formerly: Árpád híd) 1984; 2019 (renovation) 
 Forgách utca 1990; 2019 (renovation) 
 Gyöngyösi utca 1990; 2019 (renovation) 
 Újpest-Városkapu 1990; 2019 (renovation) 
 Újpest-Központ 1990; 2019 (renovation) 

There is a planned extension towards Káposztásmegyer to the northeast and Budapest Ferihegy International Airport to the southeast.

M4 Line (Northeast-Southwest)
Line M4 was originally scheduled to be complete around 2005, but, as there were numerous political debates over it, not to mention a number of civilian protests against tunnelling at certain parts of the city, building only started in 2005 and the completion date was rescheduled to 2012 or 2013. The line opened to the public at noon on 28 March 2014.

 Madárhegy ? (planned)
 Gazdagrét ? (planned)
 Kelenföld vasútállomás 2014 
 Bikás park 2014 
 Újbuda-központ 2014 
 Móricz Zsigmond körtér 2014 
 Szent Gellért tér – Műegyetem 2014 
 Fővám tér 2014 
 Kálvin tér 2014 
 Rákóczi tér 2014 
 II. János Pál pápa tér 2014 
 Keleti pályaudvar 2014 
 Reiner Frigyes park ? (planned)
 Zugló Vasútállomás ? (planned)
 Tisza István tér ? (planned)
 Bosnyák tér ? (planned)

There are plans to extend the line north towards Újpalota, and south towards Budaörs.

Planned future stations

M5 Line (North-South)

Metro line 5, Észak-déli Regionális Gyorsvasút (North-South Regional Rapid Railway; provisional name), is planned to be a suburban railways' connector line, meant to replace and connect the lines of the existing suburban railways between Szentendre (currently served by HÉV Line 5), Ráckeve (currently served by HÉV Line 6) and Csepel (currently served by HÉV Line 7). It will cross Budapest downtown, and provide connection for the railway stations in the city. It will probably have the following stations (except for the termini, only those within Budapest are included):

 Szentendre
 ...
 Békásmegyer
 Petőfi tér
 Csillaghegy
 Rómaifürdő
 Aquincum
 Záhony u.
 Kaszásdűlő
 Bogdáni út
 Flórián tér
 Amfiteátrum
 Szépvölgyi út
 Margitsziget
 Szent István park
 Lehel tér
 Oktogon
 Klauzál tér
 Astoria
 Kálvin tér
 Boráros tér
 Könyves Kálmán körút
 Beöthy u.
 Kén u.
 Timót u.
 Határ út
 Pesterzsébet – városközpont
 Nagysándor József u.
 Klapka Gy. u.
 Wesselényi u.  (or Akácfa u. instead of the latter two)
 Vörösmarty tér
 Könyves u.
 Tárcsás u.
 Soroksári vasútállomás
 BILK (logisztikai központ)
 ...
 Csepel, Ráckeve

Branching at Könyves u.:
 Soroksár felső
 Soroksár – Hősök tere
 Szent István u.
 Millennium-telep
 ...

See the map.

See also
 Trams in Budapest
 List of Budapest HÉV stations
 List of metro systems

References

External links
 BKK Zrt. – official website
 Metro.Budapest.hu
 Site of the M4 line
 METROS
 Budapest at UrbanRail.net

Budapest
Metro
 
Metro